Vriesea psittacina is a plant species in the genus Vriesea. This species is native to Brazil.

Cultivars 
 Vriesea 'Andreana'
 Vriesea 'Antonia'
 Vriesea 'Aurora Major'
 Vriesea 'Baron de Selys'
 Vriesea 'Cavalier'
 Vriesea 'Coral'
 Vriesea 'Don Gallii'
 Vriesea 'Dufricheana'
 Vriesea 'Four Moons Of Jupiter'
 Vriesea 'Gracilis'
 Vriesea 'Heinrich Schmidt'
 Vriesea 'Kienastii'
 Vriesea 'Leverett's Delight'
 Vriesea 'Medaille d'Argent'
 Vriesea 'Morreniana'
 Vriesea 'Psittacino-Fulgida'
 Vriesea 'Psittacino-Splendens'
 Vriesea 'Souvenir de Joseph Mawet'
 Vriesea 'Wiotiana'

References 
BSI Cultivar Registry Retrieved 11 October 2009

psittacina
Flora of Brazil